Fabio de Matos Pereira or Fabinho (born 26 February 1982, in Brazil), is a Brazilian football midfielder, currently playing for Botafogo-SP.

He played for Anorthosis Famagusta in Cyprus until January 2008, when the good qualities demonstrated at Anorthosis  earned him a 3-year contract with the Romanian side FC Brașov. He left FC Brașov in 2008, signing for Metalurh Donetsk in Ukraine. He signed a 3-year contract. In 2010, he signed to play for Ermis Aradippou in Cyprus. In 2011, he left the Cypriot club, signing for Skonto Riga in Latvia.

References

1982 births
Living people
Brazilian footballers
Brazilian expatriate footballers
Expatriate footballers in Cyprus
FC Brașov (1936) players
FC Metalurh Donetsk players
Anorthosis Famagusta F.C. players
Ermis Aradippou FC players
Skonto FC players
Botafogo Futebol Clube (SP) players
Ukrainian Premier League players
Liga I players
Cypriot First Division players
Brazilian expatriate sportspeople in Latvia
Expatriate footballers in Romania
Expatriate footballers in Ukraine
Brazilian expatriate sportspeople in Ukraine
Expatriate footballers in Latvia
Association football midfielders